Mononchida is an order of nematodes.

Mononchid Taxonomy 
Order Mononchida Jairajpuri, 1969 contains two Suborders as follows:
 Suborder Mononchina Kirjanova and Krall, 1969
  Superfamily Mononchoidea Filipjev, 1934
   Family Mononchidae Flipjev, 1934
    Subfamily Mononchinae Flipjev, 1934
    Subfamily Prionchulinae Andrássy, 1976
   Family Mylonchulidae Jairajpuri, 1969
    Subfamily Mylonchulinae  Jairajpuri, 1969
    Subfamily Sporonchulinae Jairajpuri, 1969
   Family Cobbonchidae Jairajpuri, 1969
    Subfamily Cobbonchinae Jairajpuri, 1969
  Superfamily Anatonchoidea Jairajpuri, 1969
   Family Anatonchidae Jairajpuri, 1969
    Subfamily Anatonchinae Jairajpuri, 1969
    Subfamily Miconchinae Andrássy, 1976
   Family Iotonchidae Jairajpuri, 1969
    Subfamily Iotonchinae Jairajpuri, 1969
    Subfamily Hadronchinae Khan and Jairajpuri, 1980
 Suborder Bathyodontina Coomans and Loof, 1970
  Superfamily Cryptonchoidea Chitwood, 1937
   Family Cryptonchidae Chitwood, 1937
   Family Bathyodontidae Clark,1961d
  Superfamily Mononchuloidea De Coninck, 1965
   Family Mononchulidae De Coninck, 1965

References 

2. Mononchida- The Predatory Soil Nematodes by Wasim Ahmad and M. Shamim Jairajpuri

Bibliography 

Enoplia
Nematode orders